Virginia Lette is an Australian radio and television presenter. Virginia co-hosted Australia's favourite music television show Eclipse Music TV on the Seven Network for three years until January 2010 and was the Weekend News and Sport Presenter for WIN News Tasmania in 2014–2015.

Lette started her radio career at 14 years of age with Snowy Mountains 2XL in Cooma. She went on to host "The Hot 30 with V and Troy" on 104.7 (Canberra), worked as an announcer and producer at Nova 106.9 in Brisbane (2005–07) and returned to her hometown of Sydney in 2007 when she became Nova 96.9's weekends announcer (2008–10).

Lette's passion for sport has seen her employed as an On-Field and corporate MC with the Canberra Raiders (2004–05), Brisbane Broncos (2006–07), St. George Illawarra Dragons (2008–09) and the Hobart Hurricanes for the KFC Twenty20 Big Bash. During the 2016–2017 Women's Big Bash League season, Lette was an On-Field MC for the Sydney Sixers at the Sydney Cricket Ground.

In February 2015, Lette was the On-Field MC at all of the ICC Cricket World Cup events at Blundstone Arena. She was also the only female On-Field MC for the NRL Finals matches and the NRL Grand Final at Allianz Stadium in October 2015.

TV career 
Lette's television credits include:
 TV news and sport presenter – WIN Television (Tasmania) 2014–15
 TV presenter and co-host – Eclipse Music TV – Seven Network 2008–10
 TV weather presenter – Southern Cross Ten 2004–05
 TV weather presenter – Prime7 Television Network 2003–04
 Features segment presenter – Canberra's Real Estate TV Southern Cross Ten 2004

Filmography 
Lette appears as herself in Death of a Gentleman – a documentary about the administration of international cricket. The 2015 film (yet to be released in Lette's home country of Australia) is receiving widespread critical acclaim throughout the United Kingdom.

Personal life 
Lette is married to New South Wales, Tasmanian and Australian Test cricketer Ed Cowan. She gave birth to their first child, a daughter, in 2012.

References

External links 

 Nova 969 radio profile
 Eclipse Music TV webpage

Year of birth missing (living people)
Living people
Australian radio personalities
Australian women radio presenters
Australian television presenters
Australian women television presenters
People from Sydney